The Korean Culture and Information Service (KOCIS) is an affiliated organization of the Ministry of Culture, Sports and Tourism of the South Korean government and runs 32 Korean cultural centers in 27 countries. The goal of the organization is to further enhance the image of Korea's national brand by promoting Korean heritage and arts through these cultural centers.

Main missions

¤ To upgrade the country's nation brand and to publicize government policies
 Carrying out projects to boost the nation brand
 Providing support for summit diplomacy by organizing cultural events and operating press centers during presidential visits abroad
 Promoting Korea's key administrative priorities and major government policies around the world

¤ To promote the spread of Hallyu and to expand cultural exchanges
 Operating overseas cultural centers and strengthening their cultural exchange function
 Organizing various international cultural exchange programs
 Expanding cultural experience programs for foreign nationals living in Korea

¤ To produce promotional content and to facilitate its use
 Producing and distributing promotional content about Korea for use overseas
 Carrying out online promotion through Korea.net, the official government multilingual web portal

¤ To foster cooperative media relations
 Providing support to foreign correspondents and visiting journalists in their coverage of Korea
 Operating the Foreign Press Center Korea
 Organizing invitational programs for media professionals from around the world

In its early years, as the Korean Overseas Information Service (KOIS), it also issued foreign language propaganda reports, such as on the Third Tunnel of Aggression.

History 
December 1971 - Inaugurated as the Korean Overseas Information Service (KOIS) under the Ministry of Culture and Information.

January 1990 - Affiliated with the Ministry of Information upon the division of the Ministry of Culture and Information into two separate ministries.

February 1998 - Affiliated with the Ministry of Culture and Tourism upon the disbandment of the Ministry of Information, and its name changed to the Korean Overseas Culture and Information Service (KOCIS).

May 1999 - Affiliated with the newly launched Government Information Agency, and its name reverted to Korean Overseas Information Service(KOCIS)

February 2008 - Affiliated with the Ministry of Culture, Sports and Tourism (MCST) in accordance with a revision to the Government Organization Act, and its name changed to the Korean Culture and Information Service (KOCIS).

February 2012 - Transferred responsibilities for the missions and tasks entrusted with the Korean Cultural Centers and Culture and Information Officers to the International Cultural Affairs Division of the MCST

September 2013 - Reassumed responsibilities for supporting and evaluating the Korean Cultural Centers and Culture and Information Officers as well as for specific executions of the Centers' programs from the International Cultural Affairs Division of the MCST

January 2015 - Reassumed the full remaining responsibilities for the work of the Korean Cultural Centers and Culture and Information Officers form the International Cultural Affairs Division of the MCST

Initiatives

Web portal of the government 

KOCIS manages KOREA.net, the official web portal of the South Korean government.

References

External links
 

Cultural promotion organizations
South Korean culture
Government agencies of South Korea